Mário Ricardo Silva Velho (born 20 August 1998) is a Portuguese professional footballer who plays for Farense as a goalkeeper.

Club career
On 23 August 2017, Velho  made his professional debut with Braga B in a 2017–18 LigaPro match against Penafiel.

References

External links

1998 births
People from Vila Nova de Famalicão
Sportspeople from Braga District
Living people
Portuguese footballers
Association football goalkeepers
S.C. Braga B players
S.C. Farense players
Liga Portugal 2 players
Campeonato de Portugal (league) players